Bodesbeck Law is a hill in the Ettrick Hills range, part of the Southern Uplands of Scotland. It is the primary west-south-western terminus of the ridge that runs parallel to the A708 road along the Dumfries and Galloway-Scottish Borders border, occasionally titled the "Bodesbeck Ridge".

References

Mountains and hills of the Southern Uplands
Mountains and hills of Dumfries and Galloway
Mountains and hills of the Scottish Borders
Donald mountains